Su Tseng-chang was announced as the 41st premier of the Republic of China by President Chen Shui-bian on 19 January 2006 and took his oath of office, along with his cabinet, on 25 January 2006. Soon after, Su promised to step down if the people's welfare (referring to crime and other civil problems) did not improve within six months. Su faced calls for his resignation after the Rebar Chinese Bank run, but refused to leave his post at the time.

On 12 May 2007, Su submitted his letter of resignation to President Chen Shui-bian, ending his tenure on 21 May. With the resignation of Su and with ten months left in Chen's presidency, that would mean Chen's eight years as President will have seen at least six Premiers (with Chang Chun-Hsiung serving two separate tenures). Su also stated that he previously submitted resignations numerous times over his sixteen-month tenure, but all were rejected by President Chen.

Cabinet members

References

Executive Yuan